Ergalatax martensi is one of the most common and the historic species of sea snail, a marine gastropod mollusk in the family Muricidae, the murex snails or rock snails. Ergalatax Martensi are commonly found within the deep blue sea and some time it gets floated to sea sand due to sea level changes. 

Most of Ergalatax Martensi specification are mentioned on World register of Marine Species.

Description
The length of the shell attains 24.2 mm.

Distribution
This marine species occurs in the Strait of Bab-el-Mandeb, Yemen; in the Red Sea and off Djibouti.

References

 Houart, R., 1996. On the identity of Morula martensis Dall, 1923 and description of a new species of Ergalatax from the Red Sea (Gastropoda: Muricidae: Ergalataxinae). The Nautilus 110(1): 12-16

External links
 MNHN, Paris: holotype

Ergalatax
Gastropods described in 1892